Nathaniel Hill (February 21, 1966– September 18, 2007) was an American football defensive end in the National Football League (NFL) for the Green Bay Packers, the Miami Dolphins and the Washington Redskins.  He played college football at Auburn University and was drafted in the sixth round of the 1988 NFL Draft.

1966 births
2007 deaths
Auburn Tigers football players
American football defensive ends
Green Bay Packers players
Miami Dolphins players
Washington Redskins players
Sacramento Surge players
People from LaGrange, Georgia